Terrance Darnell Shumpert (born August 16, 1966) is an American former professional utility player in Major League Baseball. He played college baseball at Kentucky.

Collegiate career
As a three-year starter in the middle infield for coach Keith Madison's Kentucky Wildcats baseball program, Shumpert earned All-America honors at second base in 1987. He was named first-team All-SEC in 1986 and 1987 and was a member of the SEC All-Tournament Team in 1987. 
 10 MILLIOM
As a sophomore in 1986, Shumpert hit .364 with 19 doubles, two triples, 10 homers and 37 RBI, stealing 28 bases. Shumpert had a dynamic junior season in 1987, hitting .376 with 19 doubles, four triples, nine homers and 32 stolen bases. His .374 average in 1987 ranks as the 11th-best mark in program history and he finished ranking sixth and eighth in the UK single-season stolen base record book.

Professional career
A second-round pick in the 1987 MLB Draft by the Kansas City Royals, Shumpert would make his Major League Baseball debut with the Kansas City Royals on May 1, . He last appeared in a Major League game during the 2003 season.  Shumpert hit .252 during his MLB career in 854 games, with 49 homers, 223 RBI and 85 steals.

Personal life

Shumpert's son, Nick, a shortstop, was drafted by the Detroit Tigers in the seventh round of the 2015 MLB draft. Nick chose to head to junior college and was drafted and signed by the Atlanta Braves in 2016 MLB draft. Nick is an American professional baseball infielder for the Cleburne Railroaders of the American Association of Professional Baseball.

Although it has been reported that Mookie Betts is a nephew of Shumpert, they are actually first cousins once removed, as Shumpert is a first cousin to Betts' mother, Diana. In 2004, Shumpert worked extensively with Betts while playing in Tennessee for the Nashville Sounds.

References

External links

Terry Shumpert at Pura Pelota (Venezuelan Professional Baseball League)

1966 births
Living people
Baseball players from Kentucky
African-American baseball players
Appleton Foxes players
Boston Red Sox players
Chicago Cubs players
Colorado Rockies players
Colorado Springs Sky Sox players
Eugene Emeralds players
Iowa Cubs players
Kansas City Royals players
Kentucky Wildcats baseball players
Las Vegas Stars (baseball) players
Major League Baseball second basemen
Major League Baseball shortstops
Major League Baseball outfielders
Major League Baseball third basemen
Nashville Sounds players
New Haven Ravens players
Omaha Royals players
Orlando Rays players
Paducah Tilghman High School alumni
Pawtucket Red Sox players
San Diego Padres players
Sportspeople from Paducah, Kentucky
Tampa Bay Devil Rays players
Tiburones de La Guaira players
American expatriate baseball players in Venezuela
University of Kentucky alumni
21st-century African-American people
20th-century African-American sportspeople